Maphoka Motoboli is a politician in Lesotho.

Motoboli is a member of the National Assembly of Lesotho, the lower house of the Parliament of Lesotho.

Motoboli was the Deputy Minister of Education.

See also
Politics of Lesotho

References

 
Living people
Lesotho politicians
Year of birth missing (living people)
Place of birth missing (living people)
Members of the Parliament of Lesotho